The 2016 KML Playoffs was the final phase of the 2015–16 KML season. The playoffs began on 14 April and ended on 27 May. The tournament concluded with Kalev/Cramo defeating TÜ/Rock 4 games to 1 in the finals. Rolands Freimanis was named KML Finals MVP.

Bracket

Quarterfinals
The quarterfinals are best-of-five series.

Kalev/Cramo v Valga-Valka/Maks & Moorits

TÜ/Rock v TTÜ

TLÜ/Kalev v Port of Pärnu

AVIS Rapla v Rakvere Tarvas

Semifinals
The semifinals are best-of-five series.

Kalev/Cramo v AVIS Rapla

TÜ/Rock v TLÜ/Kalev

Third place games
The third place games are best-of-five series.

TLÜ/Kalev v AVIS Rapla

Finals
The finals are best-of-seven series.

Kalev/Cramo v TÜ/Rock

References

External links
 Official website

Korvpalli Meistriliiga playoffs
playoffs